Albert P. Lukens was an American pitcher in Major League Baseball. He played for the Philadelphia Phillies of the National League in 1894.

External links

1868 births
Year of death missing
19th-century baseball players
Major League Baseball pitchers
Philadelphia Phillies players
Allentown-Bethlehem Colts players
Allentown Colts players
Hazleton Barons players
Baseball players from West Virginia
Sportspeople from Wheeling, West Virginia